is an underground metro station located in Naka-ku, Nagoya, Aichi Prefecture, Japan operated by the Nagoya Municipal Subway. It is located 0.7 rail kilometers from the terminus of the Meijō Line at Kanayama Station. It is close to Nagoya Broadcasting Network and Higashi Betsuin Temple, after which it is named.  Higashi Betsuin is an abbreviation of the name Higashi Hongan-ji Nagoya Betsuin, a Buddhist temple known formally as Shinshuōtaniha Nagoya Betsuin, which is a temple associated with the temple in Kyoto called Higashi Hongan-ji.

History
Higashi Betsuin Station was opened on 30 March 1967.

Lines

 (Station number: M02)

Layout
Higashi Betsuin Station has two underground opposed side platforms. The platforms are as follows:

Platforms

Because the station is next to Nagoya Broadcasting Network, the network's common name, Mētere, and mascot, Wandaho, are displayed on the platforms' walls.  There are two wickets.  There are four exits in two pairs, namely Exit 1 and Exit 2, and Exit 3 and Exit 4.  The station is equipped with elevators, so it is handicapped-accessible, as is the station's bathroom.

See also
:ja:真宗大谷派名古屋別院  
 Nagoya Broadcasting Network

References

External links

Official website of Nagoya Broadcasting Network 
Official website of Higashi Betsuin Temple 
Official website of Higashi Betsuin Station 
 Hokkaido Art High School (Nagoya Campus) 

Railway stations in Japan opened in 1967
Railway stations in Aichi Prefecture